Verticordia fragrans, commonly known as hollyhock verticordia, is a flowering plant in the myrtle family, Myrtaceae and is endemic to the south-west of Western Australia. It is an openly branched shrub with egg-shaped leaves and spikes of sweetly scented, pink and white flowers in spring and early summer.

Description

Flowering time is from October to November or December.

Taxonomy and naming
Verticordia fragrans was first formally described by Alex George in 1991 from specimens collected near Eneabba and the description was published in Nuytsia. The specific epithet (fragrans) is from the Latin word fragrantia meaning "fragrant" referring to the scented flowers.

George placed this species in subgenus Eperephes, section Pennuligera along with V. comosa, V. lepidophylla, V. chrysostachys, V. aereiflora, V. dichroma, V. x eurardyensis, V. muelleriana, V. argentea, V. albida, V. forrestii, V. venusta, V. serotina, V. oculata, V. etheliana and V. grandis.

Distribution and habitat
This verticordia grows in sand, sometimes with or over clay, loam or sandstone, often with other verticordia species in woodland or shrubland. It is found near Eneabba and Coomallo in the Geraldton Sandplains biogeographic region.

Conservation
Verticordia fragrans is classified as  "Priority Three" meaning that it is poorly known and known from only a few locations but is not under imminent threat.

Use in horticulture
This is one of the easier verticordias to grow in the garden. Its fragrant flowers, which will appear for a long period if older blooms are removed, make it an attractive garden plant. It is usually propagated from cuttings and will grow well in full sun or part shade. It is both drought and frost tolerant and has grown well in Sydney, near the sea as well as inland in Western Australia.

References

fragrans
Endemic flora of Western Australia
Myrtales of Australia
Rosids of Western Australia
Vulnerable flora of Australia
Plants described in 1991